The Singing Hotel is a 1953 West German musical comedy film directed by Géza von Cziffra and starring Hans Söhnker, Rudolf Platte and Fita Benkhoff. It was shot at the Wandsbek Studios of Real Film in Hamburg and on location in Oberstdorf and Kitzbühel. The film's sets were designed by the art directors Albrecht Becker and Herbert Kirchhoff.

Cast
 Hans Söhnker as Hans
 Ursula Justin as Gisela
 Fita Benkhoff as Dr. Toni Bruscher
 Rudolf Platte as Theodor Giesemann
 Paul Westermeier as Rodler, Geschäftsführer
 Rita Paul as Anita Mohr
 Bully Buhlan as Tommy Olsen
 Helmut Zacharias as Karli Alten, Violin
 Friedel Hensch as Singer
 Rosiana Larau as Dixi, Tänzerin
 Joseph Egger as Wurmser, Hotelportier
 Edith Schollwer as Frau Giesemann
 Marina Ried as Dagmar
 Josef Dahmen
 Hans Stiebner
 Wastl Witt as Anton, Kellner
 Dorle Rath as Singer
 Günther Jerschke
 Hermann Lenschau
 Joseph Offenbach

References

Bibliography
 Hans-Michael Bock and Tim Bergfelder. The Concise Cinegraph: An Encyclopedia of German Cinema. Berghahn Books, 2009.

External links 
 

1953 films
1953 musical comedy films
German musical comedy films
West German films
1950s German-language films
Films directed by Géza von Cziffra
Films set in hotels
Films set in the Alps
Skiing films
German black-and-white films
1950s German films
Films shot at Wandsbek Studios
Films shot in Austria